Edith Grossman  (born March 22, 1936) is an American Spanish-to-English literary translator.  One of the most important contemporary translators of Latin American and Spanish literature, she has translated the works of Nobel laureate Mario Vargas Llosa, Nobel laureate Gabriel García Márquez, Mayra Montero, Augusto Monterroso, Jaime Manrique, Julián Ríos, Álvaro Mutis, and Miguel de Cervantes. She is a recipient of the PEN/Ralph Manheim Medal for Translation and the 2022 Thornton Wilder Prize for Translation.

Early life
Born in Philadelphia, Pennsylvania, Grossman now lives in New York City. She received a B.A. and M.A. from the University of Pennsylvania, did graduate work at UC Berkeley, and received a Ph.D. from New York University. Her career as a translator began in 1972 when a friend, Jo-Anne Engelbert, asked her to translate a story for a collection of short works by the Argentine avant-garde writer Macedonio Fernández. Grossman subsequently changed the focus of her work from scholarship and criticism to translation.

Method
In a speech delivered at the 2003 PEN Tribute to Gabriel García Márquez, in 2003, she explained her method:

Awards and recognition
Grossman's translation of Miguel de Cervantes's Don Quixote, published in 2003, is considered one of the finest English-language translations of the Spanish novel, by authors and critics including Carlos Fuentes and Harold Bloom, who called her "the Glenn Gould of translators, because she, too, articulates every note." However, the reaction from Cervantes scholars has been more critical. Tom Lathrop, himself a translator of Don Quixote, critiqued her translation in the journal of the Cervantes Society of America, saying:  Both Lathrop and Daniel Eisenberg criticize her for a poor choice of Spanish edition as source, leading to inaccuracies; Eisenberg adds that "she is the most textually ignorant of the modern translators".

She received the PEN/Ralph Manheim Medal for Translation in 2006. In 2008, she received the Arts and Letters Award in Literature by the American Academy of Arts and Letters. In 2010, Grossman was awarded the Queen Sofia Spanish Institute Translation Prize for her 2008 translation of Antonio Muñoz Molina's A Manuscript of Ashes. In 2016, she received the Officer's Cross of the Order of Civil Merit awarded by the King of Spain Felipe VI.

In 1990 Gabriel García Márquez said that he prefers reading his own novels in their English translations by Grossman and Gregory Rabassa.

Selected translations 

Miguel de Cervantes:
 Don Quixote, Ecco/Harper Collins, 2003.
 Exemplary Novels, Yale University Press, 2016.

Gabriel García Márquez:
 Love in the Time of Cholera, Knopf, 1988.
 The General in His Labyrinth, Penguin, 1991.
 Strange Pilgrims: Stories, Alfred A. Knopf, 1993.
 Of Love and Other Demons, Knopf, 1995.
 News of a Kidnapping, Alfred A. Knopf, 1997.
 Living to Tell the Tale, Jonathan Cape, 2003.
 Memories of My Melancholy Whores, Vintage, 2005.

Mario Vargas Llosa:
 Death in the Andes, Farrar, Straus and Giroux, 1996.
 The Notebooks of Don Rigoberto, Farrar, Straus and Giroux, 1998.
 The Feast of the Goat, Picador, 2001.
 The Bad Girl, Farrar, Straus and Giroux, 2007.
 In Praise of Reading and Fiction: The Nobel Lecture, Farrar, Straus and Giroux, 2011.
 Dream of the Celt, Farrar, Straus and Giroux, 2012.
 The Discreet Hero, Farrar, Straus and Giroux, 2015.
 The Neighborhood, Farrar, Straus and Giroux, 2018.

Ariel Dorfman:
 Last Waltz in Santiago and Other Poems of Exile and Disappearance, Penguin, 1988.
 In Case of Fire in a Foreign Land: New and Collected Poems from Two Languages, Duke University Press, 2002

Mayra Montero:
 In the Palm of Darkness, HarperCollins, 1997.
 The Messenger: A Novel, Harper Perennial, 2000.
 The Last Night I Spent With You, HarperCollins, 2000.
 The Red of His Shadow, HarperCollins, 2001.
 Dancing to "Almendra": A Novel, Farrar, Straus and Giroux, 2007.
 Captain of the Sleepers: A Novel, Picador, 2007.

Álvaro Mutis:
 The Adventures of Maqroll: Three Novellas, HarperCollins, 1992.
 The Adventures of Maqroll: Four Novellas, HarperCollins, 1995.
 The Adventures and Misadventures of Maqroll, NYRB Classics, 2002.

Other works:
 José Luis Llovio-Menéndez, Insider: My Hidden Life as a Revolutionary in Cuba, Bantam Books, 1988.
 Augusto Monterroso, Complete Works & Other Stories, University of Texas Press, 1995.
 Julián Ríos, Loves That Bind, Knopf, 1998.
 Eliseo Alberto, Caracol Beach: A Novel, Vintage, 2001.
 Julián Ríos, Monstruary, Knopf, 2001.
 Pablo Bachelet, Gustavo Cisneros: The Pioneer, Planeta, 2004.
 Carmen Laforet, Nada: A Novel, The Modern Library, 2007.
 The Golden Age: Poems of the Spanish Renaissance, W.W. Norton, 2007.
 Antonio Muñoz Molina, A Manuscript of Ashes, Houghton Mifflin Harcourt, 2008.
 Luis de Góngora, The Solitudes, Penguin, 2011.
 Carlos Rojas, The Ingenious Gentleman and Poet Federico Garcia Lorca Ascends to Hell, Yale University Press, 2013.
 Carlos Rojas, The Valley of the Fallen, Yale University Press, 2018.

Essay: 
 Why Translation Matters, Yale University Press, 2010.

References

External links
Interview in Guernica Magazine about "Don Quixote"
Edith Grossman's lecture, "Translating Cervantes," delivered at the IDB Cultural Center in Washington, D.C.
2016 PEN World Voices Festival: Tribute to Edith Grossman: Making Translation Matter 
Podcast Interview with Paula Shackleton BookBuffet.com

1936 births
Living people
American translators
Spanish–English translators
Philadelphia High School for Girls alumni
Translators of Miguel de Cervantes
Writers from Philadelphia
University of Pennsylvania alumni
New York University alumni
Literary translators
American women writers
American women anthropologists